Isa is a genus of moths in the family Limacodidae. It has 5 species.

List of species 

 Isa brusha Dyar, 1927
 Isa diana Druce, 1887
 Isa obscura Dyar, 1905
 Isa schaefferana Dyar, 1905
 Isa textula Herrich-Schäffer, 1854

References 

Limacodidae
Moths described in 1864
Taxa named by Alpheus Spring Packard